The Beaumont–Adams revolver is a black powder, double-action, percussion revolver. Originally adopted by the British Army in .442 calibre (54-bore, 11.2 mm) in 1856, it was replaced in British service in 1880 by the .476 calibre (11.6 mm) Enfield Mk I revolver.

History
On 20 February 1856, Lieutenant Frederick E. B. Beaumont of the Royal Engineers was granted a British patent for improvements to the Adams revolver which allowed them to be cocked and fired either by manually cocking the hammer as in single-action revolvers or by just pulling the trigger. Beaumont was granted a US Patent (no. 15,032) on 3 June of the same year.

At that time there was intense competition between Adams and Colt, which was rapidly expanding its sales and had opened a London factory competing with the British firearms trade, manufacturing firearms with interchangeable parts. The older 1851 and 1854 Adams revolvers were self-cocking, also known as double-action. The Adams revolver was favoured by British officers in the Crimean War and colonial conflicts due to the stopping power of its larger 54 bore (.442 cal) bullet (compared with their main competitor, the smaller .36 cal Colt Navy revolvers), and the speed of the Adams trigger-cocking action for close-quarters fighting (over the more cumbersome Colt action).

In partnership with George and John Deane, the company of Deane, Adams & Deane produced the new revolver in a variety of calibres and sizes, from pocket pistols to large military versions. The United Kingdom officially adopted the 54-bore (.442 calibre) Beaumont–Adams in 1856, Holland and Russia following soon after. To meet the growing demand for its weapons, Deane, Adams & Deane contracted companies in Birmingham and Liége to manufacture their weapons under licence. The new revolver gave Robert Adams a strong competitive advantage and Samuel Colt shut his London factory due to a drop in sales.

In the US, the Massachusetts Arms Company was licensed to manufacture about 19,000 specimens of the revolver in .36 calibre, of which about 1,750 were purchased by the Union Army at the beginning of the American Civil War. They also made a pocket version in .32 calibre.

In 1867, Robert Adams' brother John Adams patented a breech-loading revolver which was adopted by the British government in place of the Beaumont–Adams. It was a solid frame pistol with six chambers, in .450 caliber. After official acceptance of his pistol, Adams left the London Armoury Company and established his own factory, the Adams Patent Small Arms Company. His pistol was manufactured in three distinct variations (differences related mainly to methods of spent cartridge ejection) between 1867 and about 1880. The models were tested and adopted by the British Army and Navy, with the last, the M1872 Mark III, seeing the widest use.

The John Adams revolver remained the official sidearm of the British Army until replaced by the Enfield Mark I in 1880.

References

External links
 

American Civil War weapons
Double-action revolvers
Early revolvers
Military revolvers
Police weapons
Revolvers of the United Kingdom
Single-action revolvers
Victorian-era weapons of the United Kingdom
Weapons of the Confederate States of America
Black-powder pistols
North-West Mounted Police